The Khurda Road–Bolangir line is a rail line between  and  which is under construction.

History 

It was surveyed in 1945 but the project was sanctioned in 1994–95. The state government has signed Memorandum of Understanding with Indian Railways to undertake some parts of the project on cost sharing basis.

The project which was initially estimated to be ₹1,000 crore (US$160 million) is now estimated to be nearly ₹2,000 crore (US$310 million) after almost 20 years of delay due to low budgetary provisions and issues of land acquisition.

This rail line will link cities of Nayagarh, Phulbani, Boudh and Sonepur with Bhubaneswar and Bolangir. Smaller towns like Daspalla, Banigochha and Mahipur will also be linked by this rail line. Work at Bolangir side of this project is completed up till Bichhupali and Bhainsapali.

A new 306.25 km-long railway line from Balangir to Khurda Road junction was sanctioned in 1994 and its foundation stone was laid in June 2001 but there has been very little progress in construction of this railway line. Out of 306.25 km length, 26 km is in Balangir district. Even all the land required for the railway line had not been acquired until the end of 2011.

In 2015–16 Rail Budget, the rail line got a green signal from Minister of Railways Suresh Prabhu as Rs 4682 crore was allotted for Odisha. As construction will be done in three phases, first between Khurda Road to Begunia a 36 km stretch then 76 km from Begunia to Daspalla and 194.25 km from Daspalla to Balangir via Phulbani & Bhainsapali under the review of Chief Minister of Odisha Naveen Patnaik.

In July 2016, Railway minister Suresh Prabhu inaugurated the Khordha Road–Begunia 36 km stretch and tracks are being laid from Begunia to Nayagarh which was completed by June 2017 and whole project to be completed in 2021.
Presently five trains run regularly between Khurda Road (KUR) and Nayagarh Town (NYGT) station.

On 15 January 2019 the prime minister of India, Sri Narendra Modi inaugurated the first train from Balangir to Bicchupalli Station on Bolangir–Khurda Road route.

This will connect Nayagarh, Phulbani, Boudh, Sonepur and Balangir which are economically backward districts in the state.

Current Status 

On 30 June 2022, Railway minister Mr Ashwini Vaishnaw opened the 13-km Mahipur-Nuagaon railway section of the Khurda Road-Balangir line. 

The 41.5-km railway line between Khurda Road and Rajsunakhala has already been commissioned and two pairs of trains are running along the stretch.

On 20 March 2017, Mr Suresh Prabhu flag off the extension of Khurda Road-Rajsunakhala passenger train up to newly built Bolagarh Road station.

Nayagarh was put on the railway map of the country on 19 June 2017 when railway minister Suresh Prabhu formally dedicated the new line from Bolagarh Road to Nayagarh as part of the ongoing Khurda Road-Balangir project. Mr Suresh Prabhu commissioned the 12.8 km line formally by video link from New Delhi.

On 30 October 2018, a trial run on the newly laid railway track between Bolangir and Bhainsapalli(renamed as Bhichhupalli) on Khurda–Bolangir route was conducted.

On 15 January 2019 the prime minister of India, Sri Narendra Modi inaugurated the first train from Balangir to Bicchupalli station on Bolangir–Khurda Road route.

The East Coast Railway (ECoR) on Saturday (20 July 2019) conducted trial run of an engine on newly built track from Nayagarh Town to Mahipur (12 km) in the ongoing Khurda Road–Balangir (289-km) railway line project. 
ECoR has already completed and commissioned about 80 km of rail line, including 65.455 km from Khurda Road to Nayagarh Town and 14.580 km from Balangir to Bichhupalli of the 25-year-old project. 
With the newly built 12 km rail line from Nayagarh Town to Mahipur, altogether 92 km rail line of Khurda Road–Balangir ongoing project has been completed.

Union Minister Dharmendra Pradhan on Thursday (26 December 2019) inaugurated the railway line between Nayagarh Town and Mahipur railway station as part of the ongoing Khurda Road–Bolangir rail project.

Commissioner of Railway Safety (CRS), South Eastern Circle, Kolkata inspected the 13.050 km long rail line between Mahipur and Nuagaon Station of the ongoing Khurda Road-Balangir Rail Line project on 23rd March 2022.

The newly-laid Broad Gauge Rail Line of 10.65 km between Bichhupali and Jhartarbha of Khurda Road-Balangir Rail Line project has been completed and commissioned, the East Coast Railway (ECoR) informed on 10 Nov 2022

References

 https://m.timesofindia.com/city/bhubaneswar/odisha-year-on-bichhupali-station-inaugurated-by-pm-gets-two-passengers-a-day/amp_articleshow/73263728.cms
 https://timesofindia.indiatimes.com/city/bhubaneswar/vaishnaw-inaugurates-mahipur-nuagaon-line/articleshow/92586445.cms

Transport in Bhubaneswar
Proposed railway lines in India
Rail transport in Odisha
Transport in Balangir
Sambalpur railway division
Khurda Road railway division
5 ft 6 in gauge railways in India